Far from Home may refer to:

Film and television 
 Far from Home (1975 film), a 1975 Iranian film
 Far from Home (1989 film), a 1989 American thriller
 Far from Home: The Adventures of Yellow Dog, a 1994 American adventure film
 "Far from Home" (Justice League Unlimited episode)
 Spider-Man: Far From Home, a 2019 American superhero film

Music 
 FFH (band) (Far From Home), a Contemporary Christian band

Albums
 Far from Home (DeeExpus album), 2009
 Far from Home (Traffic album), 1994
 Far from Home, album by Beat Kaestli, 2009

Songs
"Far from Home" (song), a 2010 song by Five Finger Death Punch
"Far from Home", a song from the 1966 musical A Time for Singing
"Far from Home", a Basshunter song from the Bass Generation album, 2009
"Far from Home", a 1991 single by Levellers
"Far from Home", a song from the David Reilly EP Inside, 2004
"(Far from) Home", a song by Tiga on the album Sexor, 2006
"Far from Home", a song by All That Remains from the album Madness, 2017

See also
 So Far from Home, an album by Brave Saint Saturn